Katherine Cheng Ip (born 17 September 1995) is an American-born former Hong Kong tennis player.

Early career and education
Ip was ranked as high as 35 in the world in juniors and is one of the few tennis players in Hong Kong to have participated in all four junior Grand Slam tournaments. She won two singles titles and two doubles titles on the ITF Circuit. In November 2013, she reached her highest WTA singles ranking of 662. In October 2017, she reached her best doubles ranking of world No. 543. 

Ip had graduated from Rice University in Houston, Texas (class of 2017) with a 4.0 GPA. At Rice, she played tennis for the Owls. Ip was the third player in program's history to earn an All-American status when she won a pair of matches at the NCAA Division 1 Tennis Championship.
She is an external vice president for the Hong Kong Students' Association. She organizes events and maintains the budget of the Hong Kong Student Association.

Playing for Hong Kong in Fed Cup, Ip has a win–loss record of 11–2.

She made her WTA Tour main-draw debut at the 2016 Hong Kong Open in doubles, partnering Eudice Chong.

ITF Circuit finals

Singles: 3 (2 titles, 1 runner-up)

Doubles: 4 (2 titles, 2 runner-ups)

References

External links
 
 
 

1995 births
Living people
Hong Kong female tennis players
Tennis players at the 2014 Asian Games
Rice Owls women's tennis players
Tennis players from San Francisco
Asian Games competitors for Hong Kong